The Church of St Cross, Clayton, Manchester, is a Victorian church by William Butterfield, built in 1863–66. It was designated a grade II* listed building in 1963.

The church is very tall, in Butterfield's trademark red brick, with blue brick and pale stone banding.  The style is Middle Pointed.  To the south-west, the church has a high tower, "narrow and tall, with slender angle buttresses and a steep pyramidal roof of banded slate, and a gabled south porch with 2-centred arched doorway".

The interior has lost most of its furnishings but remains "unmistakably Butterfield".  It has a timber-framed roof with five-bay arcades, with patterns of coloured stone and tiles that have been echoed in late 20th century stencilling.  There is some notable stained glass of the patron saints of the British Isles.

The churchyard contains the war graves of seven soldiers of World War I and two of World War II.

See also

Grade II* listed buildings in Greater Manchester
Listed buildings in Manchester-M11

Notes

References

External links

Grade II* listed churches in Manchester
Churches in Manchester
William Butterfield buildings